There have been two junior ice hockey franchises known as the Quebec Remparts that played in the Quebec Major Junior Hockey League (QMJHL). The first edition played from 1969 to 1985; the current franchise has played since 1997. Both franchises were based out of Quebec City, Quebec, Canada. The current team plays at Videotron Centre. The team is named after the Ramparts of Quebec City.

Original Remparts
The original Quebec Remparts team was founded in 1969 by a group of investors who purchased the assets of the junior Quebec Aces team. Some of the new owners included Paul Dumont, and Gérard Bolduc. The Remparts took up residence in the same arena as the Aces in the Colisée de Québec. The Remparts were finalists for the George Richardson Memorial Trophy in 1969–70, and eastern Canadian champions in 1970–71. It was this team, which featured future Hockey Hall of Famer Guy Lafleur, that won a Memorial Cup championship in 1971. The team also won the President's Cup five times. Gilles Courteau was the general manager of the Remparts from 1980 to 1985.

After the 1984–85 season, the team went into dormancy for three seasons before being resurrected. After returning to play, then-sponsored by "Le Collège Français", the team moved to Longueuil to become the Longueuil Collège Français. The team played for three seasons before moving to Verdun in 1991 to become the Verdun Collège Français. The franchise ceased operations in 1994.

Revived Remparts
The current Remparts franchise was granted for the 1990–91 season and was known as the Beauport Harfangs, a suburb in the Quebec City metropolitan area. In 1997 the team moved to Quebec City, playing two seasons at PEPS on the campus of Laval University between 1997 and 1999. In 1999 the team moved into the Colisée de Québec.

On May 28, 2006, the Remparts won the Memorial Cup, beating the Moncton Wildcats 6–2 in the finals. Then-head coach Patrick Roy became the seventh coach to win the Cup in his first year as head coach, and the first to do so since Claude Julien of the Hull Olympiques in 1997. It was also the first time in Memorial Cup history that the finals involved two teams from the QMJHL. Quebec also won the Cup without winning a League championship and without hosting the event, another first in Memorial Cup history. 

On November 27, 2014, the Remparts were sold to Quebecor for an estimated price between $20 million and $25 million. The Remparts were chosen to be the host of the 2015 Memorial Cup. They defeated the Rimouski Océanic in tie-breaker 5-2, but got eliminated by the Kelowna Rockets in the semi-finals 9-3. The team moved to Centre Vidéotron on September 12, 2015.

NHL alumni
Original Remparts
Michel Goulet, and Guy Lafleur have been inducted into the Hockey Hall of Fame.

Pierre Aubry
Rick Bowness
Stéphane Brochu
Mario Brunetta
Nelson Burton
Guy Chouinard
Réal Cloutier
Alain Côté
Sylvain Côté
André Doré
Gaétan Duchesne
Peter Folco
Eddy Godin
Michel Goulet
Richard Grenier
Val James
Michel Lachance
Pierre Lacroix
Guy Lafleur
Jean-Marc Lanthier
Kevin Lowe
Gilles Lupien
Mario Marois
Pat Mayer
Gilles Meloche
Rich Nantais
Paul Pageau
Dave Pichette
Jacques Richard
Mario Roberge
Serge Roberge
Normand Rochefort
Roberto Romano
André Savard
Jean Savard
Martin Simard
Gaston Therrien
Vincent Tremblay

Modern Remparts

Maxim Balmochnykh
Eric Chouinard
Jean-Philippe Côté
Cédrick Desjardins
Anthony Duclair
Gordie Dwyer
Simon Gagné
Alexandre Grenier
Martin Grenier
Josh Hennessy
Aaron Johnson
Juraj Kolnik
Kristian Kudroc
Guillaume Lefebvre
Jonathan Marchessault
Maxime Ouellet
Alexander Radulov
Mike Ribeiro
Kirill Safronov
Timofei Shishkanov
Antoine Vermette
Marc-Édouard Vlasic

Playoffs

See also
 CHRC (AM), defunct radio station owned by the Remparts

References

External links
Quebec Remparts Official Site

 
Quebec Major Junior Hockey League teams
Rem
Quebecor
Ice hockey clubs established in 1969
Sports clubs disestablished in 1985
Ice hockey clubs established in 1997
1969 establishments in Quebec
1985 disestablishments in Quebec
1997 establishments in Quebec